Sharayu Daftary is an Indian industrialist and a former president of the Indian Merchants' Chamber (IMC), the first elected president of the organization. She is the first woman president of the Automotive Components Manufacturers Association and the first woman to sit in the executive committee of the Federation of Indian Chambers of Commerce and Industry (FICCI). She is the founder of Bharat Radiators Limited and the president of the Dakshin Bharat Jain Sabha. The Government of India awarded her the fourth highest civilian honour of the Padma Shri, in 2004, for her contributions to the Indian industry.

Biography 
Sharayu Daftary, née Sharayu Hirachand Doshi, was born in 1933, in a rich Mumbai business family to Lalitabai and Lalchand Hirachand, a Padma Shri awardee and the brother of Walchand Hirachand, the founder of Walchand Group and one of the pioneers of Indian industry. She graduated in Economics (BA) from Elphinstone College, Mumbai and married Arvind Gaurishankar Daftary at the age of 19. She was denied entry into the family business as women were not allowed by tradition, and she founded Bharat Radiators Limited, an auto parts manufacturing concern, with a capital of 200,000 and five workers, in 1958 when she was only 25 and has been the managing director of the business ever since.

Daftary has been active in the Indian industrial scene and when she was elected as the president of the Automotive Components Manufacturers Association of India (ACMA) in 1971, she became the first woman to elected to the post. She also had the distinction of being the first woman president of the Indian Merchants' Chamber (IMC) (1981) and the first woman to be selected as a member of the executive committee of the Federation of Indian Chambers of Commerce and Industry (FICCI). She would preside over the IMC for second time, in 2000. A Jain by birth, she is the president of the Dakshin Bharat Jain Sabha and is the editor of  Jain Bodhak, a fortnightly magazine founded by her grand father and the mouthpiece of Jain community.

Daftary is a recipient of the Jain Ratna Award of the Jain Samaj and has been awarded the civilian honour of the 2004 Padma Shri by the Government of India. The Daftary couple has three daughters, the eldest daughter, Czaee Shah, is a restaurateur, Gauri Pohomal is an entrepreneur and philanthropist and the youngest, Kavita Khanna, is a homemaker and was married to actor Vinod Khanna. Saryu Doshi, the renowned art historian and Padma Shri awardee, is her sister-in-law, by marriage to her brother, Vinod Doshi.

See also 

 Lalchand Hirachand
 Walchand Hirachand
 Walchand group

References 

Recipients of the Padma Shri in trade and industry
Living people
1933 births
Businesspeople from Mumbai
Businesswomen from Maharashtra
Indian industrialists
20th-century Indian businesspeople
20th-century Indian businesswomen
Walchand family